Lake Mary or Mary Lake may refer to:

Australia

 Lake Mary, Queensland, a locality in the Shire of Livingstone

Canada

Marylake Augustinian Monastery, the property, monastery and retreat centre in King City, Ontario, Canada
Mary Lake (Ontario), a small lake

United States

Populated places
Lake Mary, California, an unincorporated community
Lake Mary, Florida, a city in Seminole County, Florida
Lake Mary Township, Douglas County, Minnesota

Lakes
Lake Mary (Arizona), a reservoir south east of Flagstaff
Lake Mary (California), a lake near Lake Mary, California in Mono County
Mary Lake (California), a lake in Redding, California
Mary Lake (Clearwater and Hubbard counties, Minnesota)
Lake Mary (Crow Wing County, Minnesota)
Lake Mary (Douglas County, Minnesota)
Lake Mary (Wisconsin), see Meromictic lake
Mary Lake, a lake in Le Sueur County, Minnesota
Lake Mary, a lake in McLeod County, Minnesota
Mary Lake, a lake in Watonwan County, Minnesota
Lake Mary (South Dakota)

See also
Llyn Mair, the Welsh name for Mary's Lake, an artificial lake in North Wales